Wrestling competitions at the 2011 Pan American Games in Guadalajara were held from October 20 to October 24 at the CODE II Gymnasium.

Medal summary

Men's events

Men's Freestyle

Men's Greco-Roman

Women's events

Women's Freestyle

Schedule
All times are Central Daylight time (UTC-5).

Qualification

Qualification was done at the 2011 Pan American Championship in Rionegro, Colombia between May 6 and 8, 2011. The top eight athletes will qualify in each weight category. Mexico is guaranteed a full team, but if it does not manage to be in the top eight, the athlete from Mexico will take the slot allotted to the eight place athlete. There are also six wild cards to be distributed. Therefore, there is a total quota of 150 athletes.

References

 
Events at the 2011 Pan American Games
2011
Pan American Games
International wrestling competitions hosted by Mexico